The First Eritrean Division or I Division Indigeni (Native) was organized for service in the Second Italo-Abyssinian War in 1935.  

It was formed from the Eritrean askari of the Battalion indigeni (Native Battalions) who provided the regular colonial forces of Italian Eritrea.
It was dissolved in 1936 after the war.

Organization 
1st Native Division - Gen. Salvatore di Pietro
 1st Mixed Brigade - Brig. Gen. Gallina
 1st Native Battalion Group
 I "Turitto" Native Battalion
 VI "Cossu" Native Battalion 
 XVI "Adi Caieh" Native Battalion
 5th Native Battalion Group 
 VII  "Prestinari" Native Battalion
 XV "Billia" Native Battalion 
 1st Mountain Artillery Battalion (65L17)
 3rd Mixed Brigade - Brig. Gen. Cubeddu
 2nd Native Battalion Group 
 III "Galliano" Native Battalion  
 XI Native Battalion
 VI Native Battalion Group
 II "Hidalgo" Native Battalion 
 XIII "Roma" Native Battalion 
 XXIV Native Battalion 
 3rd Mountain Artillery Battalion (65L17)

Commanders
 gen. Alessandro Di Pietro
 gen. Gustavo Pesenti

Divisions of Italy of the Second Italo-Ethiopian War